Glisan Glacier is an alpine glacier located on the northwest slope of Mount Hood in the US state of Oregon.

See also
List of glaciers in the United States

References

Glaciers of Mount Hood
Glaciers of Hood River County, Oregon
Mount Hood National Forest
Glaciers of Oregon